Hollick is a surname. Notable people with the surname include:

(Charles) Arthur Hollick (1857–1933), American paleobotanist
Clive Hollick, Baron Hollick (born 1945), British businessman with media interests, supporter of the Labour party
Frederick Hollick (1818–1900), American physician, sex educator, and author
Helen Hollick (born 1953), British author of historical fiction
Herbert Hollick-Kenyon (1897–1975), aircraft pilot who made significant contributions towards aviation in Antarctica
Michael Hollick (born 1973), American actor
Philip Hollick (1936–1991), cricketer who played for both Ireland and the USA
Ruth Hollick (1883–1977), Australian photographer
Sue Woodford-Hollick, Baroness Hollick, businesswoman and consultant, wife of Clive Hollick

See also
Hollick-Kenyon, Edmonton, residential neighbourhood located in north east Edmonton, Alberta, Canada
Hollick-Kenyon Peninsula, ice-covered spur from the main mountain mass of the Antarctic Peninsula
Hollick-Kenyon Plateau, large, relatively featureless snow plateau, 1,200 m to 1,800 m above sea level